Daisytown is a borough in Cambria County, Pennsylvania, United States. It is part of the Johnstown, Pennsylvania Metropolitan Statistical Area. The population was 326 at the 2010 census.

Geography
Daisytown is located in southwestern Cambria County at  (40.319674, -78.900211). It is bordered to the south and west by the city of Johnstown.

Demographics

At the 2000 census there were 356 people, 139 households, and 104 families living in the borough. The population density was 1,280.6 people per square mile (490.9/km²). There were 145 housing units at an average density of 521.6 per square mile (199.9/km²).  The racial makeup of the borough was 98.88% White, 0.28% African American, 0.28% Native American, and 0.56% from two or more races.
There were 139 households, 30.9% had children under the age of 18 living with them, 64.0% were married couples living together, 7.9% had a female householder with no husband present, and 24.5% were non-families. 20.9% of households were made up of individuals, and 10.1% were one person aged 65 or older. The average household size was 2.56 and the average family size was 2.99.

The age distribution was 22.8% under the age of 18, 5.3% from 18 to 24, 27.5% from 25 to 44, 28.9% from 45 to 64, and 15.4% 65 or older. The median age was 41 years. For every 100 females there were 85.4 males. For every 100 females age 18 and over, there were 89.7 males.

The median household income was $36,667 and the median family income  was $38,229. Males had a median income of $26,000 versus $20,000 for females. The per capita income for the borough was $14,736. About 7.5% of families and 7.0% of the population were below the poverty line, including 7.1% of those under age 18 and 6.2% of those age 65 or over.

References

Populated places established in 1776
Boroughs in Cambria County, Pennsylvania
1893 establishments in Pennsylvania